Peace Through Superior Firepower is a music DVD by the English extreme metal band Cradle of Filth, released on 1 November 2005 through Roadrunner Records.

The DVD contains a full concert filmed on 2 April 2005 at Elysée Montmartre, Paris. It also contains six music videos and extra features including footage of a signing session and a "Shockumentary".

DVD features

References 

Cradle of Filth video albums
2005 video albums
Live video albums
Roadrunner Records video albums